Anacrusis gutta is a species of moth of the family Tortricidae. It is found in Pichincha Province, Ecuador.

The wingspan is about 28 mm. The ground colour of the forewings is creamish, densely strigulated (finely streaked) and suffused with brownish. The hindwings are pale brownish, tinged creamish basad.

Etymology
The species name refers to the drop shaped forewing blotch and is derived from Latin gutta (meaning a drop).

References

Moths described in 2009
Atteriini
Moths of South America
Taxa named by Józef Razowski